The May 12, 1963, race at Cumberland, Maryland Raceway was the third racing event of the thirteenth season of the Sports Car Club of America's National Sports Car Championship.

A&B Production Results

References

External links
"Corvette News" magazine, 1963
World Sports Racing Protoytypes
RacingSportsCars.com
Dick Lang Racing History

Cumberland